Furia is a Polish black metal band formed in 2003 in Katowice, with Michał "Nihil" Kuźniak on guitar and vocals, Kamil "Sars" Staszałek on bass, Artur „A” Rumiński on guitar and Grzegorz "Namtar" Kantor on drums. It is considered one of the most influential black metal groups in Poland.

The word "furia" means "fury" in the Polish language. The musical style of the band appears raw and "cold", but the lyrics focus mostly on nihilism and misanthropy in a poetic manner, usually striving from typical paganism or anti-christianity. Some members of Furia play in MasseMord, while the vocalist Nihil - who is also the lyricist - conducts the post-black metal project Morowe.

Band members
 Michał "Nihil" Kuźniak - vocal, samples, guitar
 Kamil "Sars" Staszałek - bass
 Artur „A” Rumiński - guitar
 Grzegorz "Namtar" Kantor - drums

Discography 
 I Spokój (demo, 2004, own release)
 I Krzyk (demo, 2005, own release)
 Martwa Polska Jesień (2007, Death Solution Productions)
 Płoń (EP, 2009, Pagan Records)
 Grudzień za grudniem (2009, Pagan Records)
 Huta Laura / Katowice / Królewska Huta (2010, Pagan Records)
 Halny (EP, 2010, Pagan Records)
 Marzannie, Królowej Polski (2012, Pagan Records)
 W melancholii (EP, 2013, Pagan Records)
 Nocel (2014, Pagan Records)
 Guido (EP, 2016, Pagan Records)
 Księżyc milczy luty (2016, Pagan Records)
 Furia w Śnialni  (2021, Pagan Records)

References

Polish black metal musical groups
Musical quartets